Ryan Ramczyk (born April 22, 1994) is an American football offensive tackle for the New Orleans Saints of the National Football League (NFL). He played college football at Wisconsin, and was drafted by the Saints in the first round of the 2017 NFL Draft. A native of Stevens Point, Wisconsin, Ramczyk attended four different schools before transferring to Wisconsin–Madison in 2014, where he became an All-American lineman for the Badgers in the 2016 season.

High school career
Ramczyk attended Stevens Point Area Senior High School in Stevens Point, Wisconsin, where he played high school football. He was a First Team All-State selections by the Wisconsin Football Coaches Association in 2011, and was invited to play in the 2012 WFCA All-Star Game in Oshkosh. He turned down a scholarship offer from Pittsburgh's first-year head coach Paul Chryst and instead enrolled at a near-by Minnesota Division-II school, Winona State.

College career
Leaving Winona State before the football season began, Ramczyk enrolled first at Madison Area Technical College, then Mid-State Technical College in Stevens Point, for one semester each. In 2013, he transferred to the University of Wisconsin–Stevens Point, where his former high school coach had taken a job on the football staff. In what was technically his freshman season, Ramczyk played in all 10 games and was named Second Team All-Wisconsin Intercollegiate Athletic Conference. The following season, he earned First Team All-WIAC honors.

When Paul Chryst became head coach at Wisconsin–Madison, Ramczyk reached out and decided to transfer. After sitting out the 2015 season due to NCAA transfer rules, he was named the starter at the left tackle position for 2016, succeeding Tyler Marz. Ramczyk was named First Team All-Big Ten on November 30, 2016.

Professional career
Ramczyk received an invitation to the NFL Combine, but was only able to perform the bench press due to a hip injury. He also was unable to participate at Wisconsin's Pro Day. He had pre-draft visits with multiple teams, that included the New York Giants, Denver Broncos, Houston Texans, and New England Patriots. Projected to be a first round pick, Ramczyk was ranked the top offensive tackle available in the draft by NFLDraftScout.com, ESPN, Pro Football Focus, and NFL media analyst Bucky Brooks. Ramczyk was ranked the second-best offensive tackle in the draft by Sports Illustrated and NFL media analyst Mike Mayock.

The New Orleans Saints selected Ramczyk in the first round (32nd overall) of the 2017 NFL Draft. The pick used to draft Ramczyk was acquired from the New England Patriots in exchange for Brandin Cooks. Ramczyk made his NFL debut on September 11, 2017, in the season opener against the Minnesota Vikings. Starting at left tackle made him the first Saints' rookie to start at left tackle in a season opener since Jim Dombrowski in 1986. He started the first four games at left tackle in place of the injured Terron Armstead. He moved over to right tackle after Zach Strief was lost for the season with a knee injury. He then started 12 games at right tackle, and was named to the PFWA All-Rookie Team.

After the 2018 season, Ramczyk was named an All-Pro for the first time, being selected to the Second Team. Following the 2019 season, he was selected as the First Team All-Pro right tackle, after allowing zero quarterback sacks throughout the 2019 season, and being the highest graded offensive tackle by Pro Football Focus.

In 2020, the Saints exercised Ramczyk's fifth-year option. On June 30, 2021, Ramczyk signed a five-year, $96 million contract extension with the Saints, worth $60 million in guarantees.

References

External links

Wisconsin Badgers bio
Wisconsin–Stevens Point Pointers bio
New Orleans Saints bio

1994 births
Living people
American football offensive tackles
New Orleans Saints players
People from Stevens Point, Wisconsin
Players of American football from Wisconsin
Wisconsin Badgers football players
Wisconsin–Stevens Point Pointers football players
All-American college football players
National Conference Pro Bowl players